PII may refer to:
 Personal data, also known as personally identifiable information (PII)
 Pentium II, a computer processor
 Polaris Inc., New York Stock Exchange stock symbol PII
 Public-interest immunity, previously known as Crown privilege, in English common law
 Publisher Item Identifier, in scientific journals
 Professional indemnity insurance
 Proto-Indo-Iranian language
 Indonesian Islamic Party